This article chronicles the history of British film certificates.

Overview
The UK's film ratings are decided by the British Board of Film Classification and have been since 1912. Previously, there were no agreed rating standards, and local councils imposed their ownoften differingconditions or restrictions. For cinema releases, the BBFC has no legal power (technically, films do not even have to be submitted for classification), as it falls to councils to decide who should be admitted to a certain film, but they generally apply the BBFC's certificates, effectively making them legally binding. In exceptional cases, councils may impose their own conditions, either raising or lowering the minimum entry age from the certificate, banning a certified film outright, or setting their own minimum entry age for films that have never been submitted for BBFC certification, or which have been refused a certificate by the Board.
 
Prior to 1985, there were no legally binding ratings on video releases. The Video Recordings Act 1984 introduced new legal powers to certify video releases independently from any existing cinema certificate, with the BBFC being required to rate every new video release (except those exempted from classification) to determine the minimum age of people to whom the recording can be supplied, whether by sale or rental. In August 2009 it was discovered that the Video Recordings Act 1984 never had legal effect, due to a technical error when the terms of the act were not communicated to the European Commission. The relevant provisions were re-enacted by Parliament as the Video Recordings Act 2010.

The following list chronicles the BBFC's ratings system from its inception to the present.

In each section, italics indicates when a certificate has changed since the previous system.

History

1912–1932
At first, there were just two advisory certificates.

In Ireland, following the independence of the Irish Free State in 1922 (now the Republic of Ireland), the Irish Film Censor's Office was created in 1923 in place of the BBFC. This was renamed the Irish Film Classification Office in 2008.

1932–1951
An H (Passed as Horrific) certificate was added in 1932 to alert parents to horror-themed material.

1951–1970
Following a recommendation by the County Councils Association to replace the BBFC, the government established a committee chaired by Professor Kenneth Wheare to examine film censorship. The committee's findings were published in 1950 and proposed creation of four new certificates (X - films aimed at adults only, from which children should be absolutely excluded; C - films aimed specifically at children; Advisory U - films suitable for all; Advisory A - films suitable for all, but dealing with more adult subject matter). Only one of these proposals were adopted and saw for the first time, a compulsory certificate, X (Explicit Content), introduced allowing only those aged 16 and older to enter. This replaced the H certificate.

1970–1982
On 1 July 1970 the A certificate was split into two: the A certificate now allowed those of all ages to be admitted, but warned parents that they may not wish children under 12 to watch the film, while the new AA allowed only those aged 14 or over to be admitted. As there was now a mandatory certificate at 14, the X certificate was modified to raise its age from 16 to 18.

1982–1985
On 1 November 1982 the ratings system was completely overhauled with only the U certificate remaining unchanged (though its description was slightly modified). The A certificate was replaced by PG, which was now completely advisory. The age of AA was raised a year and the certificate was renamed 15. The X certificate was unchanged but renamed 18 due to the lewd reputation that the letter X had acquired. A new R18 certificate was introduced for sexually explicit films. In order to show R18 films, cinemas must be licensed members-only clubs (previously, a loophole allowed these clubs to show such films unrated).

1985–1989
The Video Recordings Act 1984 gave the BBFC the legal responsibility to rate all videos. The current certificates were all used and were also modified and coloured. A new Uc certificate was introduced for videos only to indicate a recording that is especially suitable for young children to watch on their own. Those under the age of a certificate could not buy or rent a video with that certificate. Shops wishing to sell or rent R18 videos had to apply for a licence. Video releases in this period often featured unofficial logos with a plain background.

1989–2002
Due to the large gap between PG and 15 and industry pressure regarding Batman, a 12 certificate was introduced on 1 August 1989. However, it was for cinema use only and did not cover videos. From this point on video releases featured the official BBFC logos. The 12 certificate was eventually introduced for videos on 1 July 1994. As the 12 certificate did not apply to video releases before July 1994, several films, which had been issued a 12 classification for cinema release, had to have a decision made about them regarding which rating was suitable for a video release and if a 15 certificate was deemed too high a rating for a particular film, a PG certificate was given with possible cuts to fit the rating. Films which received the 12 classification for cinema and 15 classification for video include Uncle Buck, which later passed with 12 for video on re-submission, and Nuns on the Run, which currently remains 15, with re-submission.  All of the symbols were also graphically edited with lighter text in 1999 from the bolder text used since 1985 although many home video releases continued to use the previous symbols.

In 2002, the cinema 12 certificate was modified and renamed 12A. Those under 12 could now be admitted to 12A films, provided that they were accompanied by an adult aged at least 18 years old, although the BBFC recommends that 12A films are generally unsuitable for children under 12 years old. Contrary to popular belief, the certificate was not introduced for the film Spider-Man, the first film to receive it was actually The Bourne Identity. However, Spider-Man and other films still on general release at the time were reclassified as 12A. Introduction of the 12A followed two years of consultation and a trial period in Norwich, during which time the certificate was known as PG-12 (see below). The video 12 certificate remained unchanged.

2002–2020
In September 2002, all of the symbols were graphically modernised but retained all their main features (colour, shape, etc.). The Uc certificate was retired in 2009, and replaced with BBFCInsight which states where works are 'particularly suitable for pre-school children'; however, older DVDs may still carry the Uc certificate. The consumer advice for the U certificate was updated to advise parents to check the film in case of children under the age of 4 and PG in case of children under 8.

2019–present 
The 12 symbol was made the same colour as the 12A symbol. In October 2019, for the first time, all of the symbols were redesigned for digital streaming services and theatrical releases. However, the packaged media continued to only use the previous symbols until late April 2020, although a transition period was allowed for video releases to use either the old or new symbols until 5 October 2020, after which all packaged media must by law use the new symbols. The BBFCInsight was replaced with ratings info.

Non-standard certificates and ratings

See also
BBFC
18 certificate
R18 certificate
Motion picture rating systems

References

External links
Official website

British Board of Film Classification
British history timelines